Upper Moreland Township is a township in Montgomery County, Pennsylvania. The population was 24,015 at the 2010 census. Upper Moreland Township is primarily a residential community with distinctive neighborhoods that are complemented by several thriving business, industrial, and commercial districts.

Geography
The township is bordered by the Montgomery County communities of Hatboro, Horsham, Upper Dublin, Abington, Bryn Athyn, and Lower Moreland. while Bucks County lies to the north.

Demographics

At the 2010 census, the township was 85.2% White, 5.1% Black or African American, 0.2% Native American, 4.4% Asian, 0.1% Native Hawaiian and Other Pacific Islander, 1.3% were Some Other Race, and 1.9% were two or more races. 3.6% of the population were of Hispanic or Latino ancestry.

At the 2000 census, there were 24,993 people, 10,120 households and 6,638 families residing in the township. The racial make-up was 90.72% White, 4.36% African American, 0.10% Native American, 3.17% Asian, 0.02% Pacific Islander, 0.58% from other races, and 1.04% from two or more races. Hispanic or Latino of any race were 1.73% of the population.

There were 10,120 households, out of which 28.3% had children under the age of 18 living with them, 53.4% were married couples living together, 9.1% had a female householder with no husband present, and 34.4% were non-families. 28.7% of all households were made up of individuals, and 12.0% had someone living alone who was 65 years of age or older. The average household size was 2.40 and the average family size was 3.00.

22.1% of the population were under the age of 18, 6.9% from 18 to 24, 31.3% from 25 to 44, 21.4% from 45 to 64, and 18.3% who were 65 years of age or older.  The median age was 39 years. For every 100 females, there were 91.8 males. For every 100 females age 18 and over, there were 88.0 males.

The median household income was $50,454 and the median family income was $61,143. Males had a median income of $41,697 and females $31,963. The per capita income was $25,382.  About 3.0% of families and 4.9% of the population were below the poverty line, including 4.1% of those under age 18 and 5.3% of those age 65 or over.

History
William Penn presented the tract of land around present day Upper Moreland Township to Nicholas More in 1682. At the time, the area was referred to as the "Manor of Mooreland". Moreland Township was first used to describe the tract in the 18th century but the current boundaries were not fixed until 1916 when a line was drawn through the Pennypack Creek and two municipalities were created: Upper and Lower Moreland Townships. In 1930, Upper Moreland Township was formally organized as a First Class Township.

Government

Upper Moreland's governmental structure and powers are derived from the laws of the Commonwealth of Pennsylvania. Upper Moreland's seven member governing body, the Board of Commissioners, is composed of representatives elected from each of the Township's seven wards to serve a four-year term. The daily operations of the municipality are administered by the Township Manager, Assistant Township Manager, Chief of Police, and Directors of Emergency Services, Code Enforcement, Public Works, Parks and Recreation, and Finance. These positions, as well as the Township Solicitor and Township Engineer, are appointed by the Board of Commissioners. The only other elected official is the Township Treasurer.

Township Commissioners:

Ward 1 - Nicholas Scull
Ward 2 - Kevin C. Spearing
Ward 3 - Charles Whiting
Ward 4 - Anthony S. Prousi
Ward 5 - Clifton (Kip) McFatridge, President
Ward 6 - R. Samuel Valenza
Ward 7 - Cheryl Lockard, Vice President

Township Treasurer: Joseph J. Olszak

Economy
The township states that the proximity of the Pennsylvania Turnpike attracts firms to the township.

China Airlines operates the Philadelphia Mini Office (Chinese: 費城營業所 Fèichéng Yíngyèsuǒ) in Building 39G at 2300 Computer Avenue in the Willow Grove CDP and in Upper Moreland Township.

Infrastructure

Transportation

Major highways serving Upper Moreland Township include the east–west Pennsylvania Turnpike (Interstate 276), with the Willow Grove Interchange located within the township, and Pennsylvania Route 611 (Easton Road), which links the area with Doylestown to the north and Philadelphia to the south and connects to the Pennsylvania Turnpike at the Willow Grove Interchange. Other important roadways in the township are Pennsylvania Route 263 (York Road), Pennsylvania Route 63 (Moreland Road), County Line Road, Davisville Road, Byberry Road, Fitzwatertown Road, Terwood Road and Blair Mill Road.

Commuter rail and bus services within Upper Moreland Township are provided by the Southeastern Pennsylvania Transportation Authority (SEPTA). The Warminster Line of SEPTA Regional Rail stops at the Willow Grove station within the township, running between Warminster and Center City Philadelphia. Multiple SEPTA bus routes serve the township, providing access to business parks and shopping centers and connecting to Philadelphia and other suburbs.

Norfolk Southern Railway's Morrisville Line freight railroad line passes through Upper Moreland Township, running parallel to the south of the Pennsylvania Turnpike.

Utilities
Electricity and natural gas in Upper Moreland Township is provided by PECO Energy Company, a subsidiary of Exelon. Water in the township is provided by Aqua Pennsylvania, a subsidiary of Aqua America. The Upper Moreland-Hatboro Joint Sewer Authority provides sewage service to Upper Moreland Township along with neighboring Hatboro. The Upper Moreland Township Public Works Department provides trash collection and recycling to the township. Cable, telephone, and internet service to the area is provided by Xfinity and Verizon. Upper Moreland Township is served by area codes 215, 267, and 445.

Health care
Jefferson Health–Abington operates the Jefferson Health–Willow Grove (formerly Abington Health Center–Willow Grove) health center in the Willow Grove section of the township. The health center, which was founded in 1983, consists of four buildings and offers outpatient hospital services including healthcare programs, medical and administrative offices, and conference and educational facilities.

Education
Upper Moreland Township is served by the Upper Moreland School District. The district consists of Upper Moreland Primary School for grades K-2, Upper Moreland Intermediate School for grades 3–5, Upper Moreland Middle School for grades 6–8, and Upper Moreland High School for grades 9-12.

The area Catholic school is Queen of Angels Regional Catholic School in Willow Grove and Upper Moreland Township, Pennsylvania. Queen of Angels was formed in 2012 by the merger of St. David in Willow Grove and Our Lady Help of Christians in Abington.

References

External links

 Upper Moreland Township official website

Townships in Montgomery County, Pennsylvania
Townships in Pennsylvania